YM-348 is an indazole derivative drug which acts as a potent and selective 5-HT2C receptor agonist, with an EC50 of 1nM and 15x selectivity over 5-HT2A, although it only has moderate selectivity of 3x over the closely related 5-HT2B receptor. It has thermogenic and anorectic effects in animal studies, making it potentially useful for the treatment of obesity.

See also 
 AL-34662
 AL-38022A
 Ro60-0175
 VER-3323

References 

Amines
Serotonin receptor agonists
Indazoles
Benzofurans
Heterocyclic compounds with 3 rings